Hypsopygia vernaculalis is a species of snout moth in the genus Hypsopygia. It was described by Carlos Berg in 1874 and is found in Argentina.

References

Moths described in 1874
Pyralini